Nhân Dân (Vietnamese: The People) is the official newspaper of the Communist Party of Vietnam.  According to the newspaper, it is “the voice of the Party, the State and the people of Vietnam.”

It has a daily circulation of 180,000 copies. Its weekend edition, Nhân Dân cuối tuần, has a circulation of 110,000 copies, and its monthly magazine has a circulation of 130,000 copies.
It has an online edition that was started on June 21, 1998.

The newspaper was first published on March 11, 1951. Its predecessor was Sự Thật ("Truth") newspaper, which was set up in the 1940s. 
Many important figures in the Vietnamese Communist Party worked at Nhân Dân. Trường Chinh and Tố Hữu were editors in chief of the newspaper. Painter Phan Kế An was a regular contributor during the First Indochina War in particular, after he was asked to join the newspaper by Trường Chinh.

Current Editor in Chief of Nhân Dân is Lê Quốc Minh.

See also
 List of newspapers in Vietnam
 Media of Vietnam

References

External links
Nhân Dân Online: English edition

Newspapers published in Vietnam
Vietnamese-language newspapers
Communist newspapers
Publications established in 1951